The Washington Institute for Near East Policy (WINEP or TWI, also known simply as The Washington Institute) is a pro-Israel American think tank based in Washington, D.C., focused on the foreign policy of the United States in the Near East.

WINEP was established in 1985 with the support of the American Israel Public Affairs Committee (AIPAC) and the funding of many AIPAC donors, in order to provide higher quality research than AIPAC's publications. John Mearsheimer and Stephen Walt described WINEP as "part of the core" of the Israel lobby in the United States.

Background

WINEP was started in 1985 by founding chairwoman Barbi Weinberg of Los Angeles, CA. Martin Indyk, an Australian-trained academic and former deputy director of research for AIPAC, was the first executive director. Indyk described the think tank as "friendly to Israel but doing credible research on the Middle East in a realistic and balanced way." The research was thus designed to be more independent and academic-quality. At the time it was founded, the institute focused research on Arab–Israeli relations, political and security issues, and overall U.S. Middle East policy. In the 1990s, prompted by the collapse of the Soviet Union, the Persian Gulf War, and changes in regional strategy, the institute expanded its research agenda to "focus on Turkey and the rise of Islamic politics." It was during the Gulf War that the institute gained public recognition as a source for commentary and analysis. By 1992, it had a staff of 12–15 in-house research fellows, in addition to visiting scholars and support staff. Under Indyk's leadership, the institute gained notability as a center for the study and discussion of Middle East policy, and attracted Arab intellectuals to its events. Indyk would go on to serve in several U.S. diplomatic posts including U.S. ambassador to Israel, special envoy for Israeli–Palestinian negotiations, special assistant to President Clinton and senior director for Near East and South Asian affairs at the National Security Council and assistant secretary of state for Near Eastern affairs. Indyk is currently vice president and director of the Foreign Policy Program at the Brookings Institution.

In addition to ongoing research, the institute has striven to provide in-depth analysis at key inflection points in Middle East policy, such as during presidential election years. Beginning in 1988, the institute convened bipartisan Presidential Study Groups that have offered policy papers for incoming administrations of either party. The inaugural PSG document informed the policy of the George H. W. Bush administration toward the Middle East peace process. The institute has earned a reputation for solid scholarship, is committed to the peace process, and is a "staunch supporter of Israel" — a relationship with which it believes advances U.S. security interests. It has bipartisan support in the USA, though it is closer ideologically to the Democratic Party and generally opposes neoconservative policy.

After the takeover of areas of Iraq by the Sunni militant group Daesh (ISIL) in 2014, The New York Times reported that Institute Lafer Fellow Michael Knights  had alerted the U.S. National Security Council as early as 2012 to the rising level of insurgency among Iraq's Sunni minority. White House officials questioned his statistics and did not take action.

The institute has been a forum for the discussion of key issues in U.S. policy toward Saudi Arabia. In May 2016, it hosted the former Saudi intelligence chief, Prince Turki bin Faisal al Saud, alongside IDF Maj. Gen. (res.) Yaakov Amidror, a former national security adviser to Prime Minister Benjamin Netanyahu, in a rare joint public appearance. Two years later, Dr. Mohammad Al-Issa, secretary-general of the Muslim World League, addressed the institute and advocated a more moderate and tolerant Islam. Dissident Saudi journalist Jamal Khashoggi participated in an institute forum in November 2016 in which he stated that Saudi Arabia should be "rightfully nervous about the Trump presidency," according to The Economist. The magazine reported that Saudi authorities asked Khashoggi to stop writing after the institute appearance but the journalist chose to live in exile instead. He was assassinated in Istanbul in 2018 while visiting the Saudi consulate.

Activities
The Washington Institute is considered an academic think tank (akin to the Brookings Institution and Public Policy Institute of California), staffed largely by researchers holding doctorate degrees and generally not having a mission affiliated with a particular ideology, as opposed to an advocacy think tank, which is staffed by individuals with strong ideological leanings. Academic think tanks focus on producing extensive research reports and books, whereas advocacy think tanks focus on marketing their ideas with condensed materials. Think tanks of all types typically also organize conferences, provide briefings to legislative committee staff, and testify as policy experts.

The Washington Institute accesses the policy process from many angles: the written word, the spoken word, and personal contact. Institute experts research the region and brief officials in all branches of the U.S. government, both civilian and military.
In addition to producing printed long-form monographs, the institute issues time-sensitive policy briefs which are distributed electronically by e-mail and social media. A Chicago Tribune editorial declared that institute-sponsored polls bring to light trends in popular thinking across the Middle East.

While the institute frequently hosts off-the-record events with policymakers and scholars, its policy forums are public events featuring newsmakers and analysts that are attended by officials and journalists and are broadcast live on-line. The institute also holds an annual policy conference that convenes policymakers, journalists and diplomats in Washington, D.C., for in-depth discussion and debate on the key Middle East issues facing the United States.

Institute scholars are public intellectuals who share their analysis frequently in major print and broadcast outlets. All institute output is available through its website in both English and Arabic.

In addition to its permanent resident fellows—a group of experienced policymakers from government and academia—the institute also hosts visiting fellows from around the world. Visiting fellows include both young people beginning their foreign policy careers and veterans who take advantage of a year in Washington, D.C., to study the Middle East from an American vantage point. In cooperation with the Army, Navy, Air Force, and State Department, WINEP offers one-year fellowships that enable rising officers to immerse themselves in the geopolitics of the Middle East and the process of Washington policymaking. The institute also supports a program for research assistants and interns that provides foreign policy experience for undergraduates and recent college graduates. Several institute alumni now hold positions in the government, military, and academia internationally.

The institute's Scholar-Statesman Award honors individuals "whose public service and professional achievements exemplify sound scholarship and a discerning knowledge of history." Recipients have included former U.S. President Bill Clinton, former British Prime Minister Tony Blair, former U.S. Secretary of State Condoleezza Rice, and former CIA directors Michael Hayden and George Tenet.

Reception

M.J. Rosenberg criticized the organization on Al Jazeera for having strong ties to the pro-Israel lobbying group AIPAC and for being founded by a former AIPAC employee.

In a December 2003 interview on Al Jazeera, Rashid Khalidi, a Palestinian-American professor and director of Columbia University's Middle East Institute, sharply criticized WINEP, stating that it is "the fiercest of the enemies of the Arabs and the Muslims", and describing it as the "most important Zionist propaganda tool in the United States." In response, Martin Kramer, the editor of the Middle East Quarterly and a visiting fellow at WINEP, defended the group, saying that it is "run by Americans, and accepts funds only from American sources," and that it was "outrageous" for Khalidi to denounce Arabs that visited WINEP as "blundering dupes."

John Mearsheimer, a University of Chicago political science professor, and Stephen Walt, academic dean at Harvard Kennedy School at Harvard University, describe it as "part of the core" of the pro-Israeli lobby in the United States. Discussing the group in their book, The Israel Lobby and US Foreign Policy, Mearsheimer and Walt write: 
Although WINEP plays down its links to Israel and claims that it provides a 'balanced and realistic' perspective on Middle East issues, this is not the case. In fact, WINEP is funded and run by individuals who are deeply committed to advancing Israel's agenda ... Many of its personnel are genuine scholars or experienced former officials, but they are hardly neutral observers on most Middle East issues and there is little diversity of views within WINEP's ranks."

In 2011 WINEP Executive Director Robert Satloff criticized the New York Times' identification of the organization as pro-Israel, saying the moniker "projects two false impressions—first, that the institute does not value American interests above special pleading for a foreign power and second, that the institute must be 'anti' others in the region (Palestinians, Arabs)."

In a 2014 study conducted by the University of Pennsylvania's Lauder Institute, of all think tanks worldwide, the Washington Institute was ranked 42nd on "Best Transdisciplinary Research Program at a Think Tank" and 42nd on "Think Tanks with Outstanding Policy-Oriented Public Programs".

Notable current and former scholars
Several current and former members of WINEP have served in senior positions in the administrations of presidents George H. W. Bush, Bill Clinton, George W. Bush, Barack Obama and Donald Trump.

Board of Advisors
As of December 12, 2018, the Washington Institute's advisory board included:
 John R. Allen, General, United States Marine Corps (ret.)
 Howard Berman, former Member of Congress
 Eliot Cohen, Paul H. Nitze School of Advanced International Studies
 Birch Evans "Evan" Bayh III, former United States Senator
 Henry Kissinger, former Secretary of State
 Joseph Lieberman, former United States Senator
 Edward Luttwak, senior associate at the Center for Strategic and International Studies
 Michael Mandelbaum, director of the American Foreign Policy program at the Paul H. Nitze School of Advanced International Studies
 Robert McFarlane, former National Security Advisor
 Martin Peretz, former editor-in-chief of The New Republic
 Richard Perle, former Assistant Secretary of Defense
 Condoleezza Rice, former Secretary of State
 James Roche, former Secretary of the Air Force
 George Shultz, former Secretary of State
 James G. Stavridis, Admiral, United States Navy (ret.), former Supreme Allied Commander
 R. James Woolsey, former Director of Central Intelligence
 Mortimer Zuckerman, publisher of U.S. News & World Report

Previous board members
 Warren Christopher (1925–2011), former Secretary of State
 Lawrence S. Eagleburger (1930–2011), former Secretary of State
 Max Kampelman (1920–2013), former American diplomat
 Samuel W. Lewis (1930–2014), former United States Ambassador to Israel

References

External links
 
 Profile of Washington Institute for Near East Policy on the International Relations Center Right Web
 U.S. think tanks give lessons in foreign policy, Brian Whitaker, Guardian Unlimited, August 19, 2002

 
1985 establishments in Washington, D.C.
501(c)(3) organizations
American Israel Public Affairs Committee
Foreign policy and strategy think tanks in the United States
Middle Eastern studies in the United States
Non-governmental organizations involved in the Israeli–Palestinian peace process
United States–Middle Eastern relations
Think tanks established in 1985